NGC 61 is a pair of lenticular galaxies, NGC 61-A (or NGC 61-1) and NGC 61-B (or NGC 61-2) in the constellation Cetus.
Both were discovered on September 10, 1785 by William Herschel.

References

External links
 
 NASA/IPAC Extragalactic Database
 
 SEDS

Lenticular galaxies
Cetus (constellation)
0061
001083/5
17850910
Discoveries by William Herschel